Fox's shrew (Crocidura foxi) is a species of mammal in the family Soricidae. It is found in Benin, Burkina Faso, Cameroon, Central African Republic, Chad, Ivory Coast, Gambia, Ghana, Guinea, Guinea-Bissau, Mali, Nigeria, Senegal, South Sudan, and Togo. Its natural habitats are subtropical or tropical moist lowland forest, moist savanna, and plantations .

References
 Hutterer, R. 2004.  Crocidura foxi.   2006 IUCN Red List of Threatened Species.   Downloaded on 30 July 2007.

Fox's shrew
Mammals of West Africa
Mammals of the Central African Republic
Fox's shrew
Taxonomy articles created by Polbot